Sao Kya Seng or Sao Kya Hseng (1924 – disappeared 3 March 1962) was a politician, a mining engineer, an agriculturalist and the last Saopha of Hsipaw State, Myanmar, from 1947 to 1959.

Biography
He studied mining engineering at the Colorado School of Mines in Golden, Colorado, United States, from 1949 to 1953. He graduated with a BSc degree in 1953 and then married. His bride, Sao Nang Thu Sandi or Inge Eberhard, a German-speaking Austrian student who had received a Fulbright Scholarship in 1951, was studying at Colorado Women's College, a constituent college of University of Denver. In 1954, he returned to Burma with her, and they had two daughters, Mayari and Kennari.

After arrival, they were crowned as saopha and mahadevi although Sao Kya Seng had already held this title since 1947. He abdicated in 1959. He served as a member of the Chamber of Nationalities from 1954 to 1962 which was upper house of Burma from 1948 to 1962, member for Shan State Council and secretary for the Association of Shan Princes from 1954 to 1962, representing Hsipaw constituency, Shan State. He was arrested in 1962 after General Ne Win's 1962 Burmese coup d'état. Sao Kya Seng was last seen being taken into custody at an army checkpoint near Taunggyi. It was later revealed that he was killed during his detention that year by the military government, who never admitted responsibility.

Sao Kya Seng was considered by the Shan people as one of the Shan national leaders who promoted federalism and democracy, together with Sao Shwe Thaik and Sao Hkun Hkio. His nephew, Khun Htun Oo, son of his elder brother Sao Kyar Zon, served as president of Shan National League for Democracy, a major political party representing Shan people.

In popular culture
Sao Kya Seng's wife, Inge, wrote a book, Twilight Over Burma: My Life as a Shan Princess, in 1994 about her marriage and life in Burma. The book became the film, Twilight Over Burma, in 2015. The film was banned in both Myanmar and Thailand.

References

External links
Thailand Joins Myanmar in Banning Movie

Colorado School of Mines alumni
People from Hsipaw
Burmese politicians
1924 births
1962 deaths
Burmese people of Shan descent